Purner is a surname. Notable people with the name include:

Andrea Purner-Koschier (born 1972), Austrian cyclist
Armin Purner, Austrian cyclist
Oscar Purner (1873–1915), American baseball pitcher
Siegfried Purner (1915–1944), Austrian handball player

See also
Purne